Yep Kramer (born 15 November 1957) is a Dutch-Frisian long track and marathon speed skater. He is the father of speed skaters Sven Kramer and Brecht Kramer.

In 1985, 1986 and 1997 he participated in the Elfstedentocht (Eleven Cities Tour), the world's largest speed skating competition. In 1997 he finished the almost 200 km long race in 8th position.

In 1993 and 1996 he participated in the Dutch natural track marathon championships (100 km). In 1993 he came in 4th and in 1996 he won the Dutch natural track marathon championships (100 km).

Personal records
To put these personal records in perspective, the WR column lists the official world records on the dates that Kramer skated his personal records.

Kramer has an Adelskalender score of 164.712 points.

Tournament overview

Medals won

References
 Yep Kramer. Deutsche Eisschnelllauf Gemeinschaft e.V. (German Skating Association).
 Personal records from Jakub Majerski's Speedskating Database
 Evert Stenlund's Adelskalender pages
 Historical World Records. International Skating Union.
 History Dutch Championships Allround. Koninklijke Nederlandsche Schaatsenrijders Bond (Royal Dutch Skaters Association).

1957 births
Living people
Dutch male speed skaters
Olympic speed skaters of the Netherlands
Speed skaters at the 1980 Winter Olympics
Speed skaters at the 1984 Winter Olympics
Sportspeople from Heerenveen
20th-century Dutch people
21st-century Dutch people